Coma Pedrosa is the highest mountain in the principality of Andorra. It is popular with mountain climbers, its ascent being technically straightforward, although strenuous. From Arinsal to Camp de Refuge (650 m climb) is considered moderate meanwhile the last 862 m is considered to be difficult. Several mountain lakes and tarns are found on the slopes, notably Estanys de Baiau, which lies on the western slopes, across the Spanish border.

The nearest town is Arinsal, La Massana. Historically, the mountain provided ample security from invasions into Andorra. Nowadays, the mountain is part of the Parc Natural Comunal de les Valls del Comapedrosa national park.

Geography

Coma Pedrosa, shaped like a pyramid, is situated at the northwestern border with France and Spain. It has in the past acted as a barrier between Andorra and France.

Its recent exposure to tourism has attracted millions to enjoy the unique scenic beauty of its hills and valleys. The higher reaches of the mountain are covered with forests while the lower reaches have some arable lands. The mountain gets fully covered with snow during the winter months which provides opportunities for skiing and mountaineering, ice climbing and scrambling. During the summer season, the mountain provides many easy routes for trekking through the Arinsal valley covering neighbouring areas of Vall Ferrera in Spain after crossing the mountain pass Baiau.

The town of Arinsal is in the narrow valley below the mountain. The Coma Pedrosa's Estany Negre, the Torta Coma, Coma's Gaspedrosa, the Puestode las Erolas, Cape dels Croes, and Puig dels Emborts in the Sierra del Aguiro surround the parish of La Massana.

The local area is known as Comapedrosa. The mountain is in a natural park called Parque Natural Comunal de los Valles del Comapedrosa (Communal natural park of the Comapedrosa valleys).

Vegetation
The forest vegetation on the mountain and in its valleys are of pines, birch and firs. There are many glacier lakes formed within the valley created by the mountains and also vast meadows. Consequent to the popularity of skiing in and around this mountain valley near Arinsal and close to the Andorra la Vella and other valleys in Andorra, the pristine ambiance of the valley has been inundated with tourist resorts, hotels, restaurants and business establishments catering to tourists. This has created an awareness to preserve virgin mountains and forests, and put restrictions on further proliferation of ski resorts and urban activities by introducing a national network of parks as preserves.

Climate

Tourism

It takes about 4 to 4 hours to reach the highest point of Pic de Coma Pedrosa. The ascent continues along a steep hill slope of the Coma Pedrosa River valley and arrives at the Coma Pedrosa refuge or camping site at an elevation , which is located near the l'Estany de les Truites (Trout Lake). A further hour's walk leads to the Estany Negre (Black Lake), named on account of its colour. The last stretch is for about one hour from Estany Negre to the highest peak in Andorra at  elevation, and this trek, passing through rocky terrain, is difficult. The return trek follows the same route. A diversion through Malhiverns pass instead of Estany Negre is more enjoyable.

In the Arinsal valley below the Coma Pedrosa, winter season offers skiing and snowboarding. The first ski lifts were installed in Arinsal in 1973. At an elevation of  lies Refugi de Coma Pedrosa, a mountain hut. It was inaugurated in 1992.

References

External links
Andorran walks
Trekking Andorra's Coma Pedrosa page

Mountains of Andorra
Mountains of the Pyrenees
Two-thousanders of Andorra
Highest points of countries